Choudens is a French surname. It may refer to:

Antony de Choudens (1849–1902), French music publisher and occasional composer
Hélène Lucie de Choudens (1868–1940), French actress under the stage name Berthe Cerny
Paul de Choudens (1850–1925), French musician, music publisher, poet and librettist